Nicolás Romat (born 6 May 1988) is an Argentine professional footballer who plays as a right-back for Bolivian club Universitario de Sucre.

References

External links
 
 
 

1988 births
Living people
Argentine footballers
Argentine expatriate footballers
Sportspeople from Buenos Aires Province
Association football defenders
Primera Nacional players
Torneo Federal A players
Argentine Primera División players
Bolivian Primera División players
Eerste Divisie players
Quilmes Atlético Club footballers
Central Norte players
Talleres de Córdoba footballers
Crucero del Norte footballers
Atlético Tucumán footballers
Club Atlético Huracán footballers
FC Den Bosch players
Club Almagro players
San Telmo footballers
Universitario de Sucre footballers
Expatriate footballers in the Netherlands
Expatriate footballers in Bolivia
Argentine expatriate sportspeople in the Netherlands
Argentine expatriate sportspeople in Bolivia